Maral-Erdene Batmunkh (born 15 October 1994) is a Mongolian professional road bicycle racer, who most recently rode for UCI Continental team . Since 2022, he rides for a Japanese team .

Career

Early life
Maral-Erdene was born in 1994 in the province of Khövsgöl in Mongolia. His grandfather is a cycling coach who organizes cycling competitions in the province. Maral-Erdene's grandfather encourages his children and grandchildren to develop cycling in their home province which led to Maral-Erdene taking up the sport in 2007.

Professional career
Maral-Erdene started his professional cycling career with teams in China before moving to the Malaysia-based  in 2016 which joins more UCI-sanctioned competition. From March 2016, Mongolian cycling-figure Jamsran Ulzii-Orshikh serves as his coach whom he idolized since childhood.

Major results

2011
 2nd Time trial, National Junior Road Championships
2014
 2nd Road race, National Road Championships
 8th Time trial, Asian Under-23 Road Championships
2015
 National Road Championships
4th Time trial
5th Road race
2016
 Asian Under-23 Road Championships
1st  Time trial
10th Road race
 National Road Championships
1st  Time trial
5th Road race
 1st Mountains classification, Tour of China I
 2nd Road race, World University Cycling Championship
 3rd Overall Tour de Filipinas
2017
 National Road Championships
1st  Time trial
2nd Road race
 1st Stage 2 Tour de Tochigi
 5th Overall Tour of Xingtai
 6th Time trial, Asian Road Championships
2018
 National Road Championships
1st  Road race
1st  Time trial
 Asian Road Championships
4th Team time trial
6th Time trial
 6th Overall Tour of Quanzhou Bay
2019
 1st Stage 4 Tour of Thailand
 1st Stage 1 Tour de Ijen
 2nd Oita Urban Classic
 3rd Road race, National Road Championships
 Asian Road Championships
4th Team time trial
6th Time trial
2022
 National Road Championships
1st  Road race
3rd Time trial
 2nd  Team time trial, Asian Road Championships

References

External links

Mongolian male cyclists
Living people
1994 births
People from Khövsgöl Province
Cyclists at the 2018 Asian Games
Asian Games competitors for Mongolia
21st-century Mongolian people